FK Radnički Kovin is a football club based in Kovin, Vojvodina, Serbia. They compete in the Vojvodina League East, the fourth tier of the national league system.

History
The club qualified for the Vojvodina League in 1975. They spent four consecutive seasons in the third tier of Yugoslav football before suffering relegation in 1979. The club returned to the Vojvodina League in 1980, but bounced back after just one season. They would spend four more consecutive seasons in the third tier from 1982 to 1986.

The club won the Vojvodina League East in the 2000–01 season and took promotion to the Serbian League Vojvodina. They spent one season in the third tier, before suffering relegation back to the fourth tier.

Honours
Vojvodina League East (Tier 4)
 2000–01
PFL Pančevo (Tier 5)
 2011–12, 2021–22

Managerial history

References

External links
 
 Club page at Srbijasport

1904 establishments in Serbia
Association football clubs established in 1904
Football clubs in Yugoslavia
Football clubs in Serbia
Football clubs in Vojvodina
Sport in Kovin